John Kimball Scott III (born October 30, 1995) is an American football punter for the Los Angeles Chargers of the National Football League (NFL). He played college football at Alabama, and was selected by the Green Bay Packers in the fifth round of the 2018 NFL Draft. He has also played for the Jacksonville Jaguars.

Early years
Scott attended and played high school football at Mullen High School in Denver. He received offers from Arizona, Colorado, and Notre Dame but ultimately accepted Alabama's offer.
Scott converted 13 of 25 field goals with a long of 59 yards and made 69 of 71 point-after attempts during his high school career. He also had 4,758 kickoff yards.

College career
Scott attended the University of Alabama, where he played on the Alabama Crimson Tide football team under head coach Nick Saban from 2014 to 2017. He was a consensus first-team All-SEC selection in 2014 and was chosen as an All-American by Sporting News, Sports Illustrated, ESPN, and USA Today. He was also named first-team All-SEC for his performances in the 2016 season, and was part of the 2015 and 2017 Alabama Crimson Tide national championship teams.

College statistics

Professional career

Green Bay Packers
Scott was selected by the Green Bay Packers with the 172nd overall pick in the fifth round of the 2018 NFL Draft. He was the second of four punters to be selected that year. On May 4, 2018, he signed a contract with the Packers. He made his NFL debut in the Packers' season opener against the Chicago Bears. He had four punts for 192 yards in the 24–23 victory. Overall, in his rookie season, Scott punted 71 times for 3,176 yards for a 44.73 average. In addition, Scott had one kickoff attempt for 61 yards. In the 2019 season, Scott finished with 	77 punts for 3,386 net yards for a 43.97 average.

On August 31, 2021, Packers released Scott as part of their final roster cuts, after they traded for punter Corey Bojorquez.

Jacksonville Jaguars
On December 31, 2021, Scott was signed to the Jacksonville Jaguars active roster.

Los Angeles Chargers
On March 21, 2022, Scott was signed by the Los Angeles Chargers. In Week 12, Scott punted six times, four inside the 20-yard line with a long of 48 in a 25-24 win over the Cardinals, earning AFC Special Teams Player of the Week.

NFL career statistics

Regular season

Postseason

Personal life
Scott is married to Sydney Scott. They married in January 2018, and have a son who was born in November 2018.

References

External links

Alabama Crimson Tide bio

1995 births
Living people
Players of American football from Denver
American football punters
Alabama Crimson Tide football players
All-American college football players
Green Bay Packers players
Jacksonville Jaguars players
Los Angeles Chargers players